= Irmaos =

Scientific classification
- Kingdom: Animalia
- Phylum: Arthropoda
- Class: Malacostraca
- Order: Isopoda
- Suborder: Oniscidea
- Family: Irmaosidae
- Genus: Irmaos; Ferrara & Taiti, 1983

Genus of crustaceans

Irmaos is a genus of crustaceans belonging to the monotypic family Irmaosidae.

The species of this genus are found in Seychelles.

Species:

- Irmaos lobatus Ferrara & Taiti, 1983
- Irmaos sechellarum Ferrara & Taiti, 1983
